Rellie may refer to:

 Alastair Rellie (1935-2018), British intelligence officer.
 Rellie Kaputin (born 1993), Papua New Guinean athlete.